Count Piotr Grigoryevich Chernyshev (24 March 1712 – 20 August 1773) was a Russian Imperial nobleman, diplomat, privy counsellor, chamberlain, and senator. He married Ekaterina Chernysheva and was the father of princess Natalya Golitsyna (1741-1837), inspiration for Pushkin's The Queen of Spades, and of Countess Darya Saltykova, a friend of the French painter Élisabeth Vigée Le Brun.

His father was a close friend of Peter the Great, who was also Piotr's godfather. Piotr enlisted in the Preobrazhensky Regiment as a child and from 1722 to 1727 served under the young Charles Frederick, Duke of Holstein-Gottorp (1700-1739) as a page, Kammerpage and finally lieutenant-captain. In 1741, during the reign of Empress Anna of Russia, he was made ambassador extraordinary to Denmark and soon afterwards ambassador extraordinary to the Kingdom of Prussia, then ruled by Frederick the Great.

Next, in 1746, he was posted to London, assisting at the Congress of Aix-la-Chapelle at the end of the War of the Austrian Succession between April and October 1748. He helped edit the treaty between Louis XIV and the maritime powers that resulted from the Congress, signed on 18 October 1748 - it settled the succession question and maritime questions and was recognised by Silesia and Prussia.

He died of dropsy in Saint Petersburg and was buried at the Alexander Nevsky Lavra in the Lazarevskoe Cemetery. His tomb inscription reads "His life was cut short by multiplying diseases, to the extreme sorrow of his neighbours and to the sincere grief of his friends and admirers". The later historian Pyotr Vladimirovich Dolgorukov wrote that "He was an intelligent and talented man, but immensely arrogant, unusually vain and intolerably arrogant; nobody loved him."

References

1712 births
1773 deaths
Russian diplomats
18th-century people from the Russian Empire
Counts of the Russian Empire
Burials at Lazarevskoe Cemetery (Saint Petersburg)
Ambassadors of the Russian Empire to Prussia
Ambassadors of the Russian Empire to the United Kingdom
Ambassadors of the Russian Empire to Denmark
Ambassadors of the Russian Empire to France